Arthur Eugene Simmons (February 5, 1926 – April 23, 2018) was an American jazz pianist.

Simmons was born in Glen White, West Virginia in February 1926. He played in a band while serving in the U.S. military in 1946, then remained in Germany after the war, studying music, and moved to Paris in 1949. There he studied at the Paris Conservatory and the Ecole Normale de Musique, playing with Charlie Parker and Kenny Clarke at the Paris Jazz Festival; he also played with Aaron Bridgers, Don Byas, Robert Mavounzy, and Nelson Williams. Simmons led his own group at the Ringside Club in 1951. In the early 1950s he played with Dizzy Gillespie and Quincy Jones, and toured London with singers such as Bertice Reading. As resident pianist at the Mars Club, he worked with Michel Gaudry, Pierre Cullaz, and Elek Bacsik, and accompanied touring singers such as Carmen McRae and Billie Holiday (1958). In the early 1960s he played in a duo with Art Taylor.

Simmons also did arranging work for Barclay Records. In 1971 he played in Spain; following this he returned to the United States and retired. He died on April 23, 2018 at the age of 92 at his home in Beckley, West Virginia.

Discography
 Boogie Woogie (Mercury Wing, 1955)

References
 Val Wilmer, "Art Simmons". The New Grove online.

External links
 Art Simmons and Aaron Bridgers when they played in The Living Room Jazz in Paris

1926 births
2018 deaths
20th-century African-American musicians
American jazz pianists
American male pianists
École Normale de Musique de Paris alumni
Musicians from West Virginia
American male jazz musicians
People from Raleigh County, West Virginia